The Beishi River is a river in northern Taiwan. It is one of tributaries of Xindian River. The river is impounded by the Fetsui Reservoir in Shiding District, New Taipei City. The Beishi River Historical Trail is a 2.6 kilometre trail that offers views of the river.

See also
List of rivers in Taiwan
Nanshi River

References

Rivers of Taiwan
Landforms of New Taipei
Landforms of Yilan County, Taiwan
Landforms of Taipei